Sebastião Miranda da Silva Filho, usually called Mirandinha, (born 26 February 1952) is a Brazilian former footballer who played as a forward. At international level, he was included in the Brazilian squad for the 1974 FIFA World Cup.

Club career
Mirandinha spent his early career in Brazil. In 1978, São Paulo sent him to the Tampa Bay Rowdies midway through the North American Soccer League season. That season, the Rowdies went to the championship where they fell to the New York Cosmos. Mirandinha scored the lone Rowdies goal in the 3–1 Soccer Bowl '78 loss. He also co-led the team in goals for the Rowdies' brief winter indoor campaign of 1979, scoring five times in five matches. He began the 1979 season in Tampa Bay before being traded to the Memphis Rogues on 7 June 1979.

Other clubs may have included ABC-RN, Guará-DF, Douradense-MS, União de Mogi-SP, Saad-SP, Independente de Limeira

International career
Mirandinha earned four caps with the Brazilian national team at the 1974 FIFA World Cup, scoring no goals and accumulating one yellow card in a first round match versus Zaire. His other appearances included once as a starter in a 0–0 tie against Scotland in the first round, and twice more as a second-half substitute in losses to Netherlands in the second round and to Poland in the third place match. He was also an unused substitute in three additional matches in the tournament.

References

External links
 
 FIFA player profile
 Tampa Bay Rowdies Appreciation Blog
 NASL stats

1952 births
Living people
People from Bebedouro
Brazilian footballers
Brazilian expatriate footballers
Brazil international footballers
1974 FIFA World Cup players
São Paulo FC players
Memphis Rogues players
North American Soccer League (1968–1984) players
North American Soccer League (1968–1984) indoor players
Tampa Bay Rowdies (1975–1993) players
Association football forwards
Footballers from São Paulo (state)